WWGR (101.9 FM), commonly called Gator Country 101.9, is a country music radio station based in the Fort Myers, Florida area. The station, which is owned by Renda Broadcasting, operates at 101.9 MHz with an ERP of 100 kW. This power gives it one of the best radio signals in all of Southwest Florida. Its transmitter is located off Corkscrew Road in Estero. This incredible signal also has its disadvantages, having exceptional interference with 101.9 "FM 101.9" WQMP, an alternative rock station licensed to Daytona Beach, but serves Orlando. The Sebring, Tampa, St. Petersburg, and Avon Park areas are the most affected by this interference with powerful radios receiving those two stations almost as one.

History
WWGR signed on in 1969 as WHEW-FM, and was a station that targeted the greater Fort Myers area as a country station during the 1970s and 1980s. During that time, the station struggled to find a strong hold on the market's country music listeners. That coupled with the increased competition from WCKT made it a very tough course for the station to sustain.

In the 1990s, WHEW-FM transformed to what is currently WWGR when the station was bought by Renda Broadcasting. Immediately following the sale of the station, the station took over the name Gator Country 101.9 Music, "Southwest Florida's Country Station".

In April 2013, two presenters at WWGR told listeners dihydrogen monoxide, a scientific description of water, was coming out of their water taps as part of an April Fool's Day hoax and were suspended for a few days by the station's general manager, Tony Renda. Renda later told NewsPress: "It is one thing when radio stations change their format or other crazy things they do. But you are messing with one of the big three, food, water or shelter. They just went too far; I just knew I didn't like that." The prank resulted in several calls by consumers to the local utility company, which sent out a release stating that the water was safe.

WWGR today
In 2005, WWGR moved from its home in Fort Myers to Bonita Springs just across the street from the Naples-Fort Myers Greyhound Track.  This new building houses WWGR and sister stations WSGL, WJGO, and WGUF.

References

External links
WWGR official website

WGR
Mass media in Fort Myers, Florida
Renda Broadcasting radio stations
1969 establishments in Florida
Radio stations established in 1969